Broad-leaved enchanter's nightshade is a common name for several plants and may refer to:
Circaea canadensis
Circaea lutetiana